Squalius castellanus is a species of freshwater fish in the family Cyprinidae. The species is endemic to Gallo River drainages in central Spain.

References

Fish described in 2007
Squalius